Emmanuel Fauré-Fremiet, ForMemRS, (1883–1971) was a French biologist.

Life 
He was the son of the composer Gabriel Fauré and Marie Fremiet, the daughter of the sculptor Emmanuel Frémiet.

He was a professor at the Sorbonne, and the Collège de France. At the Institut de Biologie Physicochimique (the Rothschild Institute), he developed diffraction X-Ray, and electron microscopy with Boris Ephrussi. He is mostly known for describing the Cilliate genus Legendrea.

References

French biologists
1883 births
1971 deaths
Foreign Members of the Royal Society
Foreign associates of the National Academy of Sciences
Academic staff of the University of Paris
Academic staff of the Collège de France
20th-century biologists
20th-century French scientists
Protistologists